Victor Besaucèle (23 March 1847 – 17 March 1924)  was a French ornithologist.

Victor Besaucèle assembled a large collection of birds including French (mainly), European and exotic species. They are now held in the Museum de Toulouse. With 5,000 extant specimens it is one of the most important historic collections in Europe.

References
Louis Ariste, Louis and Louis Braud (1898). Histoire Populaire de Toulouse Toulouse Bureaux du Midi républicain 
 Inventory of major European bird collections

French ornithologists
1847 births
1924 deaths